The Berkeley family is an ancient English noble family. It is one of only four families in Britain that can trace its patrilineal descent back to Anglo-Saxon times (the other three being the Arden family, the Swinton family and the Wentworth family). The Berkeley family retains possession of much of the lands it held from the 11th and 12th centuries, centred on Berkeley Castle in Gloucestershire, which still belongs to the family.

History
The Berkeley family descends in the male line from Robert Fitzharding (d. 1170), 1st feudal baron of Berkeley, Gloucestershire, reputedly the son of Harding of Bristol, the son of Eadnoth the Constable (Alnod), a high official under King Edward the Confessor.

Berkeley Castle, the caput of the barony, and the adjoining town of Berkeley are located in the county of Gloucestershire and are situated about five miles west of Dursley and eighteen miles southwest of Gloucester, and northeast of Bristol. The location has conferred various titles on the family over the centuries, including Baron Berkeley (barony by writ), Earl of Berkeley, and Marquess of Berkeley.

The royal manor of Berkeley was originally granted by William the Conqueror to the Norman Roger de Berkeley under the feudal tenure of fee-farm. However, the royal manor was privatized by King Henry II (1154–1189) shortly before he became king. Most of the manor was then re-granted to his supporter and financier the Anglo-Saxon Robert Fitzharding (d. 1170), of Bristol, as a feudal barony. A second barony was also created for the original family who retained their own lands within Berkeley manor as the barony of Dursley.

Shortly afterwards, under the encouragement of Henry II, who had clearly regretted the effect of his dispossession of Roger, the two families were contracted to the intermarriage of the eldest son and heir of each to the other's eldest daughter. Though only the marriage of Maurice FitzHarding and Alice de Berkeley was completed, the heirs of Robert Fitzharding thus adopted the surname "de Berkeley" and established this line as the feudal barons of Berkeley Castle.

Both lines of Berkeleys therefore originated as cousins, but it was the line of the feudal barons of Berkeley, descended from Fitzharding in the male line, which was the more powerful. By both fair means and foul, they acquired the superiority of all the lands in Berkeley in the thirteenth and fourteenth centuries and would go on to play a prominent role in British history in the next several centuries. The original family became extinct in England, but the Scottish Clan Barclay are descended in the male line from the original family.

Bruton branch

This descends from Sir Maurice Berkeley (by 1514–81), a politician who rose rapidly in the Tudor court. He came from the Berkeleys of Stoke Gifford, a cadet branch of the main Berkeley family, as a descendant of Sir Maurice de Berkeley (14th century), younger son of Maurice de Berkeley, 2nd Baron Berkeley.  This Sir Maurice, before being killed at the Siege of Calais in 1347, had acquired Stoke Gifford in 1337, and founded the line of Berkeley of Stoke Gifford.

By now a remote cousin of the main line, in his career the Tudor Sir Maurice's initial advantage was his mother's second marriage to Sir John FitzJames, Lord Chief Justice of the King's Bench, 1526–1539.  By 1538 this had brought him into the household of Thomas Cromwell, from which he passed into the royal household by 1539. He built a house on the site of Bruton Priory, a spoil of the Dissolution of the Monasteries, incorporating some of the buildings, but this was demolished in 1786. His "Bruton branch" of the family produced a number of notable figures until the 18th century, including five Barons Berkeley of Stratton (extinct in 1773), and four Viscount Fitzhardinges (extinct in 1712), as well as William Berkeley, Governor of Virginia.  Berkeley Square in London derives its name from this branch.

See also
 Saxon lineage – the House of Arden
 Saxon lineage – the House of Swinton
 Saxon lineage – the Wentworth family

Notes

References
 Virgoe, Roger, BERKELEY, Sir Maurice I (bef. 1514–81), of Bruton, Som., History of Parliament Online, accessed 22 November 2015

Bibliography
Cokayne, G. E., The Complete Peerage, new edition, Vol. 2, pp. 118–149, Berkeley
Sanders, I. J. English Baronies, Oxford, 1960, p. 13, Berkeley
Smyth, John. The Lives of the Berkeleys, Lords of the Honour, Castle and Manor of Berkeley from 1066 to 1618, ed. Sir John Maclean, 3 vols., Gloucester, 1883-1885 (first published c. 1628)
 Vol. 1, 1883
 Vol. 2, 1883
Vol. 3, 1885

External links

 
English families
History of Gloucestershire
Berkeley, Gloucestershire